Tyler Shaun Massimo Attardo (born September 10, 2001) is a Canadian professional soccer player who plays as a forward for French club Saint-Colomban Locminé.

Club career

Valour FC
Attardo signed with Canadian Premier League club Valour FC on January 28, 2019, making him the youngest player to sign in league history. He made his professional debut for Valour FC on May 1, against Pacific FC. On June 20 he scored his first professional goal for Valour in a 2–1 loss to Pacific FC. That season, he scored six goals in twenty league appearances and made another two appearances in the Canadian Championship.

Fernández Vial
On February 20, 2020, Attardo was transferred to Chilean Segunda División side Fernández Vial for what is believed to have been a six figure fee, which made him the first player transferred to South America from the CPL.

Xylotymbou (loan)
Attardo joined Cypriot Second Division club Xylotymbou in September 2020. It was later clarified that the move was a two-year loan deal and Fernández Vial intended to sell him to a European club the following summer. On September 19, 2020, Attardo made his league debut for Xylotymbou as a 65th-minute substitute in a 2–0 loss to Onisilos Sotira.

Granville (loan)
On January 20, 2022, Attardo went on loan with French National 2 side US Granville until the end of the season.

Saint-Colomban Locminé
On July 26, 2022, Attardo signed with Championnat National 3 side Saint-Colomban Locminé.

Career statistics

References

External links

2001 births
Living people
Association football forwards
Canadian soccer players
Soccer players from Winnipeg
Canadian sportspeople of Italian descent
Canadian expatriate soccer players
Expatriate footballers in Italy
Canadian expatriate sportspeople in Italy
Expatriate footballers in Chile
Canadian expatriate sportspeople in Chile
Expatriate footballers in Cyprus
Canadian expatriate sportspeople in Cyprus
Expatriate footballers in France
Canadian expatriate sportspeople in France
Valour FC players
C.D. Arturo Fernández Vial footballers
P.O. Xylotymbou players
US Granville players
Saint-Colomban Sportive Locminé players
Canadian Premier League players
Cypriot Second Division players
Championnat National 2 players
Championnat National 3 players